Senator Paine may refer to:

Elijah Paine (1757–1842), U.S. Senator from Vermont from 1795 to 1801
Ephraim Paine (1730–1785), New York State Senate 
George Eustis Paine (1920–1991), New York State Senate 
William W. Paine (1817–1882), Georgia State Senate

See also
Senator Payne (disambiguation)